Ethmia nigripedella is a moth in the family Depressariidae. It is found in Ukraine, Turkestan, Central Asia, eastern Siberia, Mongolia, northern Tibet, China (Kuku-Nor, Shansi) and Japan (Hokkaido, Kuschiro).

Adults have been recorded from late April to early July.

References

Moths described in 1877
nigripedella
Moths of Japan